In quantum information theory, the channel-state duality refers to the correspondence between quantum channels and quantum states (described by density matrices). Phrased differently, the duality is the isomorphism between completely positive maps (channels) from A to Cn×n, where A is a C*-algebra and Cn×n denotes the n×n complex entries, and positive linear functionals (states) on the tensor product

Details
Let H1 and H2 be (finite-dimensional) Hilbert spaces. The family of linear operators acting on Hi will be denoted by L(Hi). Consider two quantum systems, indexed by 1 and 2, whose states are density matrices in L(Hi) respectively. A quantum channel, in the Schrödinger picture, is a completely positive (CP for short), trace-preserving linear map

that takes a state of system 1 to a state of system 2. Next, we describe the dual state corresponding to Φ.

Let Ei j denote the matrix unit whose ij-th entry is 1 and zero elsewhere. The (operator) matrix

is called the Choi matrix of Φ. By Choi's theorem on completely positive maps, Φ is CP if and only if ρΦ is positive (semidefinite). One can view ρΦ as a density matrix, and therefore the state dual to Φ.

The duality between channels and states refers to the map

a linear bijection. This map is also called Jamiołkowski isomorphism or Choi–Jamiołkowski isomorphism.

Applications 
This isomorphism is used to show that the "Prepare and Measure" Quantum Key Distribution (QKD) protocols, such as the BB84 protocol devised by C. H. Bennett and G. Brassard are equivalent to the "Entanglement-Based" QKD protocols, introduced by A. K. Ekert. More details on this can be found e.g. in the book Quantum Information Theory by M. Wilde.

References

Quantum information theory